Richard Mullins is an American musician best known as the former bassist of the rock bands Karma to Burn, Year Long Disaster, and Speedealer (originally REO Speedealer before lawsuit). He also produced and is the co-creator of the animated docuseries, Mike Judge Presents: Tales from the Tour Bus.

Discography

Karma to Burn
Karma to Burn (Roadrunner Records, 1997)
Wild, Wonderful Purgatory (Roadrunner Records, 1999)
Almost Heathen (Spitfire Records, 2001)
Appalachian Incantation (Napalm Records, 2010)
V (Napalm Records, 2011)

Year Long Disaster
 Year Long Disaster (2007, Volcom Entertainment)
 Black Magic; All Mysteries Revealed (2010, Volcom Entertainment)

References

External links

Living people
Year of birth missing (living people)
American bass guitarists
Guitarists from Los Angeles
Karma to Burn members
Year Long Disaster members